Frederick Hillary Creekmore, Sr. (born November 12, 1937) is a politician and former Democratic member of the Virginia House of Delegates. He represented the 78th district, which included the city of Chesapeake, from 1974 to 1990.

He studied at the University of Richmond, and the T.C. Williams School of Law.

Creekmore served ten years as a judge on Virginia's First Judicial Circuit, starting with his appointment in 1998 and ending with his retirement on February 1, 2008.

Creekmore is an elder of Great Bridge Presbyterian Church.

References

External links
Biography on the Virginia House website

Living people
1937 births
University of Richmond alumni
Democratic Party members of the Virginia House of Delegates
Politicians from Chesapeake, Virginia
Politicians from Norfolk, Virginia
American Presbyterians
Virginia circuit court judges